Emanuel Rosenfeld (February 6, 1898 – February 4, 1959) was one of the four founders of the Delaware Valley-based automotive parts retailer Pep Boys – Manny, Moe & Jack.  After mustering out of the Navy in 1921 he and three friends from the service, Maurice "Moe" Strauss, Graham "Jack" Jackson and Moe Radavitz, chipped in $200 each to open an auto parts supply store on 63rd and Market Streets in Philadelphia, Pennsylvania.

In 1946, when the company went public, Rosenfeld became Pep Boy's first corporate president, and he held the position until his death from cancer in 1959.

References

1959 deaths
American Jews
1898 births